The following is a list of releases by Rock Ridge Music, an independent music label in Nashville, TN. Founded in 2004, it has signed, managed, and/or promoted artists including Reel Big Fish, Sister Hazel, Rachel Platten, Attack! Attack! UK, The Ike Reilly Assassination, Fiction Family and The Damnwells.

Catalog

See also
 :Category:Rock Ridge Music albums

References

External links
 Rock Ridge Music

Rock Ridge Music
Rock Ridge Music